The 2019 South Dakota State Jackrabbits football team represented South Dakota State University in the 2019 NCAA Division I FCS football season. They were led by 23rd-year head coach John Stiegelmeier and played their home games at Dana J. Dykhouse Stadium in Brookings, South Dakota as members of the Missouri Valley Football Conference. They finished the season 8–5, 5–3 in MVFC play to finish in a three-way tie for third place. They received an at-large bid to the FCS Playoffs where, after a first round bye, they lost in the second round to Northern Iowa.

Previous season

The Jackrabbits finished the season 10–3, 6–2 in MVFC play to finish in second place. They received an at-large bid to the FCS Playoffs where they defeated Duquesne in the second round and Kennesaw State in the quarterfinals, before losing in the semifinals to North Dakota State.

Preseason

MVFC poll
In the MVFC preseason poll released on July 29, 2019, the Jackrabbits were predicted to finish in second place.

Preseason All–MVFC team
The Jackrabbits had five players selected to the preseason all-MVFC team.

Offense

Pierre Strong Jr. – RB

Cade Johnson – WR

Bradey Sorenson – LS

Defense

Ryan Earith – DL

Christian Rozeboom – LB

Schedule

Game summaries

at Minnesota

LIU

Drake

Southern Utah

Southern Illinois

at Youngstown State

at Indiana State

North Dakota State

at Missouri State

Illinois State

Northern Iowa

at South Dakota

FCS Playoffs
The Jackrabbits entered the postseason tournament as the number seven seed, with a first-round bye.

Northern Iowa–Second Round

Ranking movements

References

South Dakota State
South Dakota State Jackrabbits football seasons
South Dakota State
South Dakota State Jackrabbits football